The following is a list of some notable Old Ardinians, being former pupils of Ardingly College in the United Kingdom.

Politics

Sir Andrew Bowden  - Member of Parliament (Conservative)
Sir Robert Cary, 1st Baronet - Member of Parliament (Conservative)
Jack Easter - Member of the Legislative Assembly in New South Wales
Sir John Gorst - Member of Parliament (Conservative)
Sir James Simpson  - Cabinet Minister in Uganda
Sir Robert Tasker - Member of Parliament (Conservative)

Diplomacy

Robert Alston    - UK High Commissioner to New Zealand and UK Ambassador to Oman
Chris Gunness - UNRWA chief spokesperson
Sir Claude Hayes  - civil servant for overseas territories
Sir Edward Jackson  - UK Ambassador to Belgium and UK Ambassador to Cuba
Ian Mackley  - UK High Commissioner to Ghana and UK Chargé d'Affaires to Afghanistan
Sir David Manning  - UK Ambassador the United States and UK Ambassador to Israel
Sir Robin McLaren  - UK Ambassador to China and UK Ambassador to the Philippines
Sir Andrew Wood  - UK Ambassador to Russia and UK Ambassador to Yugoslavia

Sciences
Harold Comber - botanist
Mike Pitts - archaeologist
John Paul Wild  - radio astronomer

Academia
Mark Bevir - Professor of Political Science at the University of California, Berkeley and the United Nations University
Frank Cowell - Professor of Economics at the London School of Economics
Robert Foley - Leverhulme Professor of Human Evolution at the University of Cambridge
Sue Hamilton - Professor of Prehistory at (and former director of) the UCL Institute of Archaeology
Patrick Hanks - lexicographer

Arts

Stage and screen
Dick Allen - film editor
Charles Bryant - actor and film director
Josh Dylan - (actor)
Creighton Hale - actor
Alan Howard  - actor
Mark Letheren - actor
Ed Sanders - actor
Terry-Thomas - actor
Frank Williams - actor
Suhana Khan - actress

Writers

Nicholas Fisk - children's author
Neil Gaiman - author and screenwriter
Thomas Meech - author and journalist
Ed Whitmore - screenwriter
Music
Alex Cartana - singer
Mike Christie - singer
Julian Clifford - conductor
James Lancelot - organist
Stephen Oliver - composer
Victor Silvester  - composer and band leader
Ed Welch - composer
Visual arts
George Belcher - artist
John Hayes  - director of the National Portrait Gallery (1974–1994)

Media

Sir Bill Cotton  - controller of BBC One (1977–1981)
Colin Griffiths - broadcaster
Ian Hislop - editor of Private Eye and panelist on Have I Got News For You
Nick Newman - cartoonist and scriptwriter
Ed Petrie - children's television presenter
Paul Reynolds - BBC News correspondent
Jay Wynne - BBC weather forecaster

Sport

Motor sports
Max Chilton - Formula One, WEC, and IndyCar racing driver
Clifford Earp - racing driver
Mike Hawthorn - Formula One racing driver and World Champion (1958)
Football
George Brann - England footballer and Sussex cricketer
Donald Coles - footballer
Adam Virgo - footballer
Cricket
Walter Bettesworth - Scotland and Sussex cricketer
William Blackman - Sussex cricketer
Ben Brown - Sussex and Hampshire cricketer
Dale de Neef - Scotland cricketer
Alex Gregory - South Australia cricketer
Arthur Kneller - Hampshire cricketer
Billy Newham - England and Sussex cricketer 
Toby Peirce - Sussex cricketer
Paul Phillipson - Sussex cricketer
Abidine Sakande - Sussex and Leicestershire cricketer
Valentine Sewell - Dorset cricketer
Thomas Symington - Rhodesia cricketer

Industry and commerce

Sydney Allard - founder of Allard Motor Company
Charles Cruft - founder of Crufts dog show
Sir Charles Fairey  - founder of Fairey Aviation Company
Sir Richard Morris  - industrialist

Military
Lieutenant Commander Peter Piper  - submarine commander
Lieutenant Colonel George Starr  - Special Operations Executive agent and leader
Major General Robert Whittaker  - Anti Aircraft divisional commander

Ecclesiastical
Walter Adams, Archbishop of British Columbia and Yukon
George Browning, Bishop of Canberra and Goulburn
Dennis Ede, Archdeacon of Stoke
Gordon Mursell, Bishop of Stafford
Andrew Norman, Principal of Ridley Hall, Cambridge

Other
John Hooper - President of the British Orthodontic Society

References

 
People educated by school in West Sussex
Ardinians